SHIA Station or Soekarno–Hatta International Airport Station (BST) is a station for Soekarno–Hatta Airport Rail Link service. The station is located between Skytrain station of Terminal 1 and Terminal 2 of Soekarno–Hatta International Airport.

This station serves airport passengers going to Batuceper Station, Duri Station, BNI City Station, to Manggarai Station. The station began serving passengers on 26 December 2017 and was inaugurated on 2 January 2018.

Building and layout 
SHIA station is nestled in an integrated building, which can accommodate about 3500 passengers. The station has two platforms, both equipped with full-height platform screen doors. There are a passenger lobby, four escalators and two elevators placed across the terminal building. The station is equipped with facilities such as ticket counters (only Debit or Credit Card is acceptable), public spaces, electronic gates, waiting rooms, commercial rooms, restrooms, prayer rooms, the rail administrator room, and a SkyTrain station. The station yard can accommodate four trains of 10 carriages.

The ground floor of the building is fully used for the Soekarno-Hatta Airport railway station. The airport skytrain station is located on the upper level.

Services

Passenger services

Airport rail link

Airport skytrain 

  Airport Skytrain to Terminal 1, 2, and 3.

Incidents 

 On 5 February 2018, This station was temporarily closed considering that there was a landslide around the airport which caused the airport rail link to temporarily stop operating. The airport rail link service was restored three days later on 8 February 2018.

See also
Soekarno–Hatta International Airport 
Jakarta Metro Commuter Rail

References

External links

Tangerang
Railway stations in Banten
Railway stations opened in 2017
2017 establishments in Indonesia
Airport railway stations in Indonesia
Soekarno–Hatta International Airport